Vincent Namatjira  (born 14 June 1983) is an Aboriginal Australian artist living in Indulkana, in  the Anangu Pitjantjatjara Yankunytjatjara (APY lands) in South Australia. He has won many art awards, and after being nominated for the Archibald Prize several times, he became the first Aboriginal person to win it in 2020. He is the great-grandson of the Arrente watercolour artist Albert Namatjira.

Early life
Namatjira was born on 14 June 1983 in Alice Springs in the Northern Territory, and spent his early years in Hermannsburg. He is the great-grandson of renowned watercolour artist Albert Namatjira, and identifies as a Western Aranda man. After his mother, Jillian, died in 1991, Vincent and his sister were removed by the state and sent to foster homes in Perth, Western Australia, thousands of kilometres away.

Of this period, he has said that he felt lost and did not have good memories of childhood, especially as an adolescent. When he was 18, he travelled to Ntaria (Hermannsburg) to find his extended family. Here he drew reconnected with lost culture, language and country, and got involved with land management issues. During a trip through the Anangu Pitjantjatjara Yankunytjatjara, he met his wife, Natasha, and settled with her family at Kanpi.

In 2011, he was inspired to take up painting by Natasha and her father, Kunmanara (Jimmy) Pompey, both artists based at Iwantja Arts, an Aboriginal-owned and -operated centre in Indulkana.

He and his family visited Ntaria, where they studied his aunt, the late Elaine Namatjira (cited as Eileen), a leader of the Hermannsburg Potters, create artworks about their country. He learnt more of the impact of his great-grandfather, Albert Namatjira.

Career
Namatjira began painting in 2012 initially working on traditional dot paintings and taught by his wife Natasha. In 2013, he started painting portraits, starting with his great-grandfather Albert Namatjira. His work has been exhibited regularly since 2012.

His 2014 series, Albert's Story, tells the story of great-grandfather's life and reflects on his legacy. About the series, Namatjira said: "I hope my grandfather would be quite proud, maybe smiling down on me; because I won’t let him go. I just keep carrying him on, his name and our families' stories". The series, which comprises 13 paintings, from "Being Initiated in the Bush" to "Albert Namatjira in Prison" to "Dies in Hospital, Broken Heart", is held by QAGOMA, and is available to view online. Artworks from the series were included in Namatjira's 2021 children's book, Albert Namatjira.

His entry for the 2016 TarraWarra Biennial, Endless circulation, comprised a series of portraits of the seven prime ministers who had been in power in Australia during his lifetime until that point.

Also in 2016, he painted a series of portraits of the seven wealthiest people in Australia, entitled The Richest, which has been shown in many exhibitions. The portraits include Blair Parry-Okeden, Gina Rinehart, Harry Triguboff, Frank Lowy, Anthony Pratt, James Packer and John Gandel.

Three Legends, Namatjira's entry for the National Aboriginal and Torres Strait Islander Art Awards (NATSIAA) in 2017, was a series of three portraits: David Unaipon, the first published Indigenous Australian writer; Jimmy Little, the first Indigenous performer to have a top 10 single; and Lionel Rose, the first Indigenous boxer to win a world title.

He has painted Donald Trump, whose birthday is on the same day as his own, several times.

In 2018 he painted Legends, a series of portraits of Aboriginal men which included singer Archie Roach, artist Gordon Bennett, land rights campaigner Eddie Mabo, and Australian Football League player Nicky Winmar, who famously lifted his football jersey and pointed at his skin when he was being racially vilified.

Close Contact (2019) is a double-sided portrait on plywood featuring a full-length Captain James Cook on one side and a full-length self-portrait on the other. This won the Ramsay Art Prize, and remains in the collection of the Art Gallery of South Australia.

Australia in Black and White (2019) features a series of 16 portraits drawn with ink on paper. The faces include those of media mogul Rupert Murdoch, former prime minister Julia Gillard, footballer and anti-racism campaigner Adam Goodes, as well as, once again, Albert Namatjira and Eddie Mabo.

In 2020 he again painted Goodes, this time with himself also in the portrait, entitled Stand strong for who you are. He said the inspiration had come from watching The Australian Dream, a documentary film about Goodes and the racism he endured on and off the field. This portrait won the Archibald Prize, making Namatjira the first Indigenous Australian artist to win the  prize. It was painted in acrylic on linen, with Goodes depicted as "a proud Aboriginal man who stands strong for his people".

On 26 February 2021, a work originally commissioned by the Museum of Contemporary Art Australia in Sydney to coincide with the 250th anniversary of Captain Cook's arrival in Australia (2020) but delayed by the COVID-19 pandemic in Australia, was eventually unveiled. It features  his father-in-law, Kunmanara (Jimmy) Pompey, next to am Aboriginal stockman on a horse; Adam Goodes; Lionel Rose, the first Aboriginal boxer to win a world title; Eddie Mabo and his Albert Namatjira. It also features himself:

In August 2021, Namatjira's children's picture book about his grandfather, entitled Albert Namatjira, was published by Magabala Books. The artwork in the book was taken from the 2014 series Albert's Story. It was shortlisted in the 2022 Australian Book Industry Awards in the "Small Publishers’ Children’s Book of the Year" category.

In July 2022,  as part of two festivals – Illuminate Adelaide and Tarnanthi –  Namatjira created a huge animation to be projected each night for two weeks on the facade of the Art Gallery of South Australia, a work of public art entitled Going Out Bush. The animation includes elements of landscape from around Indulkana (his home) as well as Ntaria (home of his grandfather Albert), Toyota cars, and the Aboriginal flag. During the day, inside the gallery, his Archibald Prize-winning portrait of Adam Goodes is exhibited as part of a touring exhibition.

Style and themes
According to Bruce McLean, curator of Indigenous Australian art at QAGOMA, "Reconnecting with his history... had a massive impact on Vincent and [gave] his art a real impetus...". He also described Namatjira as "one of the leading lights of the emerging generation of artists from remote central Australia".

Namatjira's style is very bold, and his paintings have been described as caricatures, bordering on "outsider art". They often depict famous and powerful people standing alongside the artist, as if in a publicity shoot, with frequent references to Captain James Cook, the British royal family and contemporary Indigenous life. He has said that he is interested in people and their stories, and likes to use humour in his paintings. He has said that Cook, the 18th-century British explorer, is one of his favourite subjects, and it was one of his portraits of Cook that was purchased by the British Museum.

Although his portraits resemble caricature, according to the art historian Wes Hill they also have "a level of sophistication that only a colourist, not a satirist, could possess".

Exhibitions
Namatjira's first solo exhibition was held in 2016.

His work has been exhibited at the British Museum (in Indigenous Australia: Enduring Civilisation, 2015); TarraWarra Museum of Art (TarraWarra Biennial, 2016); the Art Gallery of South Australia (Tarnanthi, 2017 & 2018); Art Basel Miami Beach (2018);  Artspace Sydney, (Just Not Australian, 2018); Gallery of Modern Art, Brisbane (Asia Pacific Triennial, 2018); Australian Centre for Contemporary Art (ACCA), Melbourne (2018); Hazelhurst Regional Gallery and Arts Centre (2018), Warrnambool Art Gallery (2018) and Flinders University Museum of Art.

The exhibition at ACCA, A Lightness of Spirit is the Measure of Happiness, featured 10 specially commissioned works by Aboriginal artists of south-east Australia, including Namatjira, Robert Fielding, Yhonnie Scarce, Kaylene Whiskey and others.

In July–August 2022, his work was exhibited alongside that of Kaylene Whiskey and Tiger Yaltangki in an exhibition called Iwantja Rock n Roll at the Fort Gansevoort gallery in New York. The exhibition includes his five-part series of portraits of Queen Elizabeth II, entitled Elizabeth (on Country) (2021), in which the queen's face is juxtaposed with the Australian landscape.

Collections
Namatjira's work is held in the British Museum, Art Gallery of New South Wales, Art Gallery of Western Australia, Art Gallery of South Australia and Queensland Art Gallery/Gallery of Modern Art.

Awards and honours 
On 8 June 2020, Namatjira was awarded a  Medal of the Order of Australia (OAM) "in recognition of his service to Indigenous visual arts and the community", in the 2020 Queen's Birthday Honours.

His artwork has been selected as a finalist or winning entry in a number of significant art awards. A selection follows.
Archibald Prize:
2017: Shortlisted, Self-portrait on Friday
2018: Highly Commended, Studio self-portrait
2019: Finalist, Art is our weapon – portrait of Tony Albert
2020: Winner, Archibald Prize, for Stand strong for who you are, featuring AFL player Adam Goodes and the artist
2022: Finalist, Archibald Prize, Self-portrait with dingo

Telstra National Aboriginal and Torres Strait Islander Art Awards:
2013: Finalist
2014: Finalist
2016: Finalist
2017: Finalist
2018: Finalist
2013, 2015: Finalist, John Fries Award
2015: Finalist, Western Australian Indigenous Art Awards at the Art Gallery of Western Australia
2017: Invited finalist in the University of Queensland Art Museum's National Self-Portrait Prize 
2018: Finalist, Alice Art Prize, for his painting of his great-grandfather Albert and the watercolour artist who influenced Albert's work, Rex Battarbee

2019: Winner, Ramsay Art Prize, for Close Contact; worth , awarded by the Art Gallery of South Australia, open to Australian artists under 40 years old 
2022: Finalist, Sulman Prize

Publications

Personal life

Namatjira is married to Natasha Pompey and they live at Indulkana with their children .

References

Further reading

External links
 

1983 births
Living people
Australian Aboriginal artists
Arrernte people
Australian portrait painters
21st-century Australian artists
Artists from South Australia
Recipients of the Medal of the Order of Australia
Archibald Prize winners
Archibald Prize finalists